The WTA Austrian Open is a WTA Tour affiliated women's tennis tournament held off and on from 1968. In the Open Era, seven locations hosted the event: Pörtschach in 1968 and 1999; Kitzbühel from 1969 to 1983 and from 1990 to 1993; Vienna in 1979 and from 2001 to 2004; Bregenz from 1985 to 1986; Maria Lankowitz from 1994 to 1998, Klagenfurt in 2000 and Bad Gastein from 2007 to 2015 where it took place as Nürnberger Gastein Ladies. The tournament which is held on outdoor clay courts was not contested in 1984, 1987 to 1989 and from 2005 to 2006.

Four Austrians won the singles event: Judith Wiesner in 1995, Barbara Paulus in 1996, Barbara Schett in 1997 and 1999 and Yvonne Meusberger in 2013. Two Austrians were victorious in the doubles event: Petra Huber in 1986 partnering West German Petra Keppeler, Patricia Wartusch in 2002 partnering Hungarian Petra Mandula along with Sandra Klemenschits in 2013, partnering Slovenian Andreja Klepač. Romanian Virginia Ruzici holds the Open Era record for singles titles, with three victories in 1980, 1982 and 1985.

Nürnberger Gastein Ladies was a tennis tournament held in Bad Gastein, Austria between 2007 and 2015. It was an International event on the WTA Tour with total prize-money of $250,000 and was played on red clay. In 2016, a new addition to the 2016 calendar was announced on March 11, the Ladies Championship Gstaad, Switzerland, which replaced the Nurnberger Gastein Ladies International tournament, held in Bad Gastein since 2007.

In 2020, amidst the COVID-19 pandemic, the WTA announced the Carinthian Ladies Open, a WTA 125K tournament, to be held in Austria on clay courts. The tournament will be held during the same week as the 2020 US Open, and will allow players affected by the cancellation of US Open qualifying to compete. However, the tournament was cancelled just days after the announcement due to the pandemic.

Prize money

Results (Open Era)

Singles

Doubles

See also
 List of tennis tournaments

References

External links
 WTA Results Archive
 Official website
 Webcam of the centre court of the WTA Gastein Ladies

 
Clay court tennis tournaments
Recurring sporting events established in 1968
Recurring events disestablished in 2004
Tennis tournaments in Austria
 
Tennis in Austria
WTA Tour
Recurring sporting events established in 2007
Recurring sporting events disestablished in 2015